Vernon Valley is a hamlet located in the Town of Huntington in Suffolk County, Long Island, New York, United States. It is located at the southeast corner of the incorporated Village of Northport, and is in the Northport postal zone, and is within the census-designated place of East Northport.

The name is more generally applied to the entire hollow (or valley) that runs south from this point for approximately 1.5 miles to East Northport.  Not coincidentally, the thoroughfare is named "Vernon Valley Road." The building which is now known as the St. Paul's Lutheran School, located near the southern terminus, was originally built as The Vernon Valley Inn.  With the demise of that business, the last reference other than the local street passed from common usage.

History 
The location cited was originally known as "Red Hook", and was centered on what is now the intersection of NYS Route 25A, Main Street, Waterside Avenue, and Vernon Valley Road.  When the village of Northport was incorporated in the late 1800s, the northwest quadrant of the area fell within the new village limits.

References

Huntington, New York
Hamlets in New York (state)
Hamlets in Suffolk County, New York